Nevus lipomatosus (cutaneous) superficialis (NLS or NLCS, also known as "Nevus lipomatosis of Hoffman and Zurhelle") is characterized by soft, yellowish papules or cerebriform plaques, usually of the buttock or thigh, less often of the ear or scalp, with a wrinkled rather than warty surface. It is usually congenital
in origin or appears within the first three decades.

A pedunculated lipofibroma is a solitary variant of nevus lipomatosus superficialis. It usually appears in adult life, and usually on the axilla, knee, ear, arm, scalp and the lower trunk.

In both multiple and solitary variants, the histopathology shows variable amounts of mature lipocytes within the dermis. Occasionally, there is an excessive fibrocollagenous tissue proliferation. The main differential diagnoses are acrochordon, seborrheic keratosis, intradermal melanocytic nevi, neurofibromas, verrucae and fibroepithelioma of Pinkus.

See also
 Skin lesion
 List of cutaneous conditions

References

Dermal and subcutaneous growths